Lydia Webb (1736 or 1737-1793) was an English actress. She started acting in Norwich. She was married twice. First, she married a man named Mr. Day. Second, she married a Mr. Webb. Her first notable performance was on 21 November 1772 at the Theatre Royal, Edinburgh, performing in The West Indian. She died in 1793.

Career
Webb was a versatile and proactive performer. She was in more than 50 plays. When she was elderly, she played more "grotesque characters." She performed many parts including:
Portia, The Merchant of Venice, 29 November 1773
Mrs. Peachum, The Beggar's Opera, Covent Garden Theatre
Mrs. Honeycombe, Polly Honeycombe, Haymarket Theatre
Glumdalca, Tom Thumb, Covent Garden Theatre
Queen, Hamlet
Emilia, Othello

and many other performances. In 1786, she was featured in an illustration by James Sayers, which is now held in the collection of the National Portrait Gallery, London.

References

1793 deaths
Actors from Norwich
1730s births
18th-century English actresses
English stage actresses